Stephen Douglas Parkes (born June 2, 1965) is an American prelate of the Roman Catholic Church who has served as the bishop of the Diocese of Savannah in Georgia since September 2020.

Early life and education 
Stephen D. Parkes was born in Mineola, New York, on June 2, 1965. He is the youngest of three sons born to Joan and Ron Parkes. Stephen Parkes attended Massapequa High School in Massapequa, New York.  His older brother Gregory Parkes is the bishop of the Diocese of St. Petersburg in Florida.

Stephen Parkes earned a Bachelor of Business Administration/Marketing from the University of South Florida in Tampa, Florida, in 1987, then worked in banking and retail for several years.  In 1992, he entered the St. Vincent de Paul Regional Seminary in Boynton Beach, Florida. receiving a Master of Divinity degree. Parkes is fluent in Spanish, having studied it in high school, college, and seminary, plus a six-week language immersion course in Costa Rica.

Priesthood 
On May 23, 1998, Parkes was ordained by Bishop Norbert Dorsey to the priesthood for the Diocese of Orlando at Saint James Cathedral in Orlando.  After his ordination, Parkes was assigned as parochial vicar to Annunciation Catholic Parish in Altamonte Springs, Florida. In 2004, he was named spiritual director for the Catholic campus ministry at the University of Central Florida in Orlando.

Parkes' first appointment as pastor was in 2005 at Most Precious Blood Parish in Oviedo, Florida. In 2011, he returned to Annunciation Catholic Parish to serve as pastor until 2020. Parkes also served on the Investment Committee of the Diocese of Orlando, as dean of the North Central Deanery (2010- 2020), and as a spiritual director to the Catholic Foundation of Central Florida (2019-2020).

Bishop of Savannah 
On July 8, 2020, Pope Francis appointed Parkes as bishop of the Diocese of Savannah. On September 23, 2020, he was consecrated by Archbishop Gregory Hartmayer at the Cathedral Basilica of St. John the Baptist in Savannah, with attendance restricted due to the COVID-19 pandemic.

On September 29, 2020, Parkes and the diocese were sued by William Fred Baker Jr.  He claimed that the diocese knew that Wayland Yoder Brown, a diocese priest, was molesting him in 1987 and 1988  when he was a 10 year old attending St. James Catholic School in Savannah, Georgia.  Brown, who died in prison, had received a 20-year sentence for sexual abuses crimes.

See also

 Catholic Church hierarchy
 Catholic Church in the United States
 Historical list of the Catholic bishops of the United States
 List of Catholic bishops of the United States
 Lists of patriarchs, archbishops, and bishops

References

External links

Roman Catholic Diocese of Savannah Official Site  
Roman Catholic Diocese of Orlando Official Site

 

1965 births
Living people
People from Mineola, New York
21st-century Roman Catholic bishops in the United States
Bishops appointed by Pope Francis